Craig Charles Fishbein is a member of the Connecticut House of Representatives representing the 90th State House District. He was born on July 16, 1965. A resident of Wallingford, Connecticut, he was first elected to the Connecticut General Assembly as a State Representative in 2016, in a special election (to fill the vacancy created by the passing of Mary G. Fritz) and a regular election, both held on the same date. He represents parts of Wallingford and Cheshire.

Biography
Fishbein was born on July 16, 1965 in Queens, New York. He graduated from Mark T. Sheehan High School in 1983 and Quinnipiac University in 1997 with a degree in Marketing, and from Quinnipiac University School of Law in 2001. Since 2002, he has been practicing law with his father, at Fishbein Law Firm, LLC,  in Wallingford.

Political career
Fishbein is a member of the Wallingford Town Council, having first been elected to that position in 2009. In addition to his duties as a member of the Town Council, he was the Chairman of its Ordinance Committee, from 2012 through 2017.

Fishbein is serving his third term as State Representative for Connecticut's 90th District which includes portions of Wallingford, Connecticut, and  Cheshire, Connecticut.  In his first term, Fishbein served on the Public Safety and Security Committee, Energy & Technology Committee, and the Commerce Committee. In this second term, he served on the Labor and Public Sector Employees Committee, the Judiciary Committee, and the Public Safety and Security Committee. In his third term he is serving as the Ranking Member of the Judiciary Committee, as well as the Government Accountability & Elections Committee, and the Environment Committee.

Fishbein is a founding member of the Connecticut General Assembly Conservative Caucus and is currently its vice-chairman.

Controversies 
In 2018, during a House debate, Fishbein used the phrase "monkey see, monkey do" while discussing ethnic minorities seeking recompense for discrimination based on their hairstyle. Fishbein later apologized for the comment. The bill, known as the CROWN Act, passed the state House with a vote of 139-9, with Fishbein voting against it.

In 2018, Fishbein, who is also a family law attorney received widespread criticism for saying, "I can tell you from the divorces that I do, which are many, sometimes domestic violence is arranged, involved, and sometimes it’s appalling," during a House debate over a bill that would reduce arrests of domestic violence victims when they call the police for help. The bill, which would have an effect on domestic violence survivors, a majority of whom are ethnic minority women, passed the Connecticut State Senate unanimously and passed the Connecticut House of Representatives with a vote of 147-1. Fishbein was the only member of the legislature to vote against it.

On May 30, 2020, Fishbein retweeted an image of Joe Biden with the caption, "If you aren't setting fire to buildings...then you ain't black." Fishbein said in an apology that he didn't "know the extent of what was going on" and removed the tweet on Monday, June 1, following criticism from both Democrats and Republicans. On Tuesday, June 2, the Wallingford Town Council voted unanimously to censure Fishbein, with one calling the retweet "backwards and unsophisticated". On June 12, 2020, about 200 people attended a rally outside of town hall calling for his resignation. Fishbein later stated that he did not believe sharing the meme was a "racist act" stating that "it was instead an 'albeit awkward attempt at trying to point out the racial double standard which exists on the left.' While Fishbein admits retweeting the meme with no context or clarification was a mistake, he insists that the purpose of it was not to express racists sentiments."

Electoral history

References

1965 births
Living people
21st-century American politicians
Quinnipiac University alumni
Republican Party members of the Connecticut House of Representatives